Hong Kong British may refer to:
Hong Kong people in the United Kingdom
Britons in Hong Kong
Hong Kong people included in the British Nationality Selection Scheme
Hong Kong people with the status of British National (Overseas)

See also
British Hong Kong
British nationality law and Hong Kong
Hong Kong English